Here is a list of micropolitan statistical areas in the United States.  As defined by the United States Census Bureau, a micropolitan statistical area is the area (usually a county or grouping of counties) surrounding and including a core city with population between 10,000 and 49,999 (inclusive).  Suburbs of metropolitan areas are generally not considered to be micropolitan core cities, although they can be if they are in another county from the metropolitan core.

The states of Delaware, Massachusetts, New Jersey, and Rhode Island do not have micropolitan areas as defined by the US Census Bureau.

Alabama
Albertville
Alexander City
Cullman
Daphne-Fairhope
Enterprise-Ozark
Eufaula
Fort Payne
Scottsboro
Selma
Talladega-Sylacauga
Troy
Tuskegee
Valley

Alaska
Juneau
Ketchikan
Kodiak

Arizona
Nogales
Payson
Safford
Show Low

Arkansas
Arkadelphia
Batesville
Blytheville
Camden
El Dorado
Forrest City
Harrison
Hope
Magnolia
Mountain Home
Paragould
Russellville
Searcy
West Helena

California
Bishop
Clearlake
Crescent City
Eureka-Arcata-Fortuna
Phoenix Lake-Cedar Ridge
Red Bluff
Susanville
Truckee-Grass Valley
Ukiah

Colorado
Cañon City
Durango
Edwards
Fort Morgan
Montrose
Silverthorne
Sterling

Connecticut
Torrington
Willimantic

Florida
Arcadia
Clewiston
Homosassa Springs
Key West
Lake City
Okeechobee
Palatka
Sebring
The Villages
Wauchula

Georgia
Americus
Bainbridge
Calhoun
Cedartown
Cordele
Cornelia
Douglas
Dublin
Fitzgerald
Fort Valley
Jesup
LaGrange
Milledgeville
Moultrie
St. Marys
Statesboro
Summerville
Thomaston
Thomasville
Tifton
Toccoa
Vidalia
Waycross

Hawaii
Hilo
Kahului-Wailuku
Kapaa

Idaho
Blackfoot (includes Bingham County)
Burley (includes Cassia and Minidoka Counties)
Moscow (includes Latah County)
Mountain Home (includes Elmore County)
Rexburg (includes Fremont and Madison Counties)

Illinois
Canton
Carbondale
Centralia
Charleston-Mattoon
Dixon
Effingham
Freeport
Galesburg
Harrisburg
Jacksonville
Lincoln
Macomb
Marion-Herrin
Mount Vernon
Ottawa
Pontiac
Quincy
Rochelle
Sterling
Taylorville
West Frankfort

Indiana
Angola
Auburn
Bedford
Connersville
Crawfordsville
Decatur
Frankfort
Greensburg
Huntington
Jasper
Kendallville
Logansport
Madison
Marion
New Castle
North Vernon
Peru
Plymouth
Richmond
Scottsburg
Seymour
Vincennes
Wabash
Warsaw
Washington

Iowa
Boone
Burlington
Clinton
Fort Dodge
Fort Madison-Keokuk
Marshalltown
Mason City
Muscatine
Newton
Oskaloosa
Ottumwa
Pella
Spencer
Spirit Lake
Storm Lake

Kansas
Atchison
Coffeyville
Dodge City
Emporia
Garden City
Great Bend
Hays
Hutchinson
Kansas City
Lawrence
Liberal
Manhattan
McPherson
Parsons
Pittsburg
Salina
Topeka
Wichita
Winfield

Kentucky
Campbellsville
Central City
Corbin
Danville
Frankfort
Glasgow
London
Madisonville
Mayfield
Maysville
Middlesborough
Mount Sterling
Murray
Paducah
Richmond-Berea
Somerset

Louisiana
Abbeville
Bastrop
Bogalusa
Crowley
De Ridder
Fort Polk South
Hammond
Jennings
Minden
Morgan City
Natchitoches
New Iberia
Opelousas-Eunice
Pierre Part
Ruston
Tallulah

Maine
Augusta-Waterville
Rockland

Maryland
Cambridge
Easton
Lexington Park

Michigan
Adrian
Allegan
Alma
Alpena
Big Rapids
Cadillac
Coldwater
Escanaba
Houghton
Iron Mountain
Ludington
Marquette
Midland
Mount Pleasant
Owosso
Sault Ste. Marie
Sturgis
Traverse City

Minnesota
Albert Lea
Alexandria
Austin
Bemidji
Brainerd
Fairmont
Faribault-Northfield
Fergus Falls
Grand Rapids
Hutchinson
Mankato-North Mankato
Marshall
New Ulm
Owatonna
Red Wing
Willmar
Winona
Worthington

Mississippi
Brookhaven
Clarksdale
Cleveland
Columbus
Corinth
Greenville
Greenwood
Grenada
Indianola
Laurel
McComb
Meridian
Natchez
Oxford
Picayune
Starkville
Tupelo
Vicksburg
West Point
Yazoo City

Missouri
Branson
Cape Girardeau-Jackson
Farmington
Fort Leonard Wood
Hannibal
Kennett
Kirksville
Lebanon
Marshall
Maryville
Mexico
Moberly
Poplar Bluff
Rolla
Sedalia
Sikeston
Warrensburg
West Plains

Montana
Bozeman
Butte-Silver Bow
Havre
Helena
Kalispell

Nebraska
Beatrice
Columbus
Fremont
Hastings
Kearney
Lexington
Norfolk
North Platte
Scottsbluff

Nevada
Elko
Fallon
Gardnerville Ranchos
Pahrump

New Hampshire
Berlin
Claremont–Lebanon
Concord
Keene
Laconia

New Mexico
Alamogordo
Carlsbad-Artesia
Clovis
Deming
Espanola
Gallup
Grants
Hobbs
Las Vegas
Los Alamos
Portales
Roswell
Ruidoso
Silver City
Taos

New York
Amsterdam
Auburn
Batavia
Corning
Cortland
Gloversville
Hudson
Jamestown-Dunkirk-Fredonia
Malone
Ogdensburg-Massena
Olean
Oneonta
Plattsburgh
Seneca Falls
Watertown-Fort Drum

North Carolina
Albemarle
Boone
Brevard
Dunn
Elizabeth City
Forest City
Henderson
Kill Devil Hills
Kinston
Laurinburg
Lincolnton
Lumberton
Morehead City
Mount Airy
North Wilkesboro
Roanoke Rapids
Rockingham
Salisbury
Sanford
Shelby
Southern Pines-Pinehurst
Statesville-Mooresville
Thomasville-Lexington
Washington
Wilson

North Dakota
Dickinson
Jamestown
Minot
Wahpeton
Williston

Ohio
Ashland
Ashtabula
Athens
Bellefontaine
Bucyrus
Cambridge
Celina
Chillicothe
Coshocton
Defiance
East Liverpool-Salem
Findlay
Fremont
Greenville
Marion
Mt. Vernon
New Philadelphia-Dover
Norwalk
Portsmouth
Sidney
Tiffin-Fostoria
Urbana
Van Wert
Wapakoneta
Washington
Wilmington
Wooster
Zanesville

Oklahoma
Ada
Altus
Ardmore
Bartlesville
Duncan
Durant
Elk City
Enid
Guymon
McAlester
Miami
Muskogee
Ponca City
Shawnee
Stillwater
Tahlequah
Woodward

Oregon
Albany-Lebanon
Astoria
Brookings
The Dalles
Coos Bay
Grants Pass
Hood River
Klamath Falls
La Grande
Ontario
Pendleton–Hermiston
Prineville
Roseburg

Pennsylvania
Bradford
DuBois
Huntingdon
Indiana
Lewisburg
Lewistown
Lock Haven
Meadville
New Castle
Oil City
Pottsville
Sayre
Selinsgrove
Somerset
Sunbury
Warren

Puerto Rico
Adjuntas
Coamo
Jayuya
Santa Isabel
Utuado

South Carolina
Bennettsville
Chester
Dillon
Gaffney
Georgetown
Greenwood
Hilton Head Island-Beaufort
Lancaster
Newberry
Orangeburg
Seneca
Union
Walterboro

South Dakota
Aberdeen
Brookings
Huron
Mitchell
Pierre
Spearfish
Vermillion
Watertown
Yankton

Tennessee
Athens
Brownsville
Columbia
Cookeville
Crossville
Dyersburg
Greeneville
Harriman
Humboldt
La Follette
Lawrenceburg
Lewisburg
Martin
McMinnville
Newport
Paris
Sevierville
Shelbyville
Tullahoma
Union City

Texas
Alice
Andrews
Athens
Bay City
Beeville
Big Spring
Bonham
Borger
Brenham
Brownwood
Cleburne Cleburne, Texas
Commerce
Corsicana
Del Rio
Dumas
Eagle Pass
El Campo
Gainesville
Granbury
Hereford
Huntsville
Jacksonville
Kerrville
Kingsville
Lamesa
Levelland
Lufkin
Marble Falls
Marshall
Mineral Wells
Mount Pleasant
Nacogdoches
Palestine
Pampa
Paris
Pecos
Plainview
Raymondville
Rio Grande City-Roma
Schertz
Snyder
Stephenville
Sulphur Springs
Sweetwater
Uvalde
Vernon

Utah
Cedar City
Heber
Price
Summit Park
Vernal

Vermont
Barre
Bennington
Rutland

Virginia
Culpeper
Martinsville
Staunton-Waynesboro

Washington
Aberdeen
Centralia
Ellensburg
Moses Lake
Oak Harbor
Port Angeles
Pullman
Shelton
Walla Walla

West Virginia
Beckley
Bluefield
Clarksburg
Fairmont
Oak Hill
Point Pleasant

Wisconsin
Baraboo
Beaver Dam
Manitowoc
Marinette
Menomonie
Merrill
Monroe
Platteville
Stevens Point
Watertown-Fort Atkinson
Whitewater
Wisconsin Rapids-Marshfield

Wyoming
Evanston
Gillette
Jackson
Laramie
Riverton
Rock Springs
Sheridan

Footnotes
Part of this micropolitan statistical area is also in the state of Georgia.
Part of this micropolitan statistical area is also in the state of Idaho.
Part of this micropolitan statistical area is also in the state of Illinois.
Part of this micropolitan statistical area is also in the state of Kentucky.
Part of this micropolitan statistical area is also in the state of Louisiana.
Part of this micropolitan statistical area is also in the state of Michigan.
Part of this micropolitan statistical area is also in the state of Minnesota.
Part of this micropolitan statistical area is also in the state of Missouri.
Part of this micropolitan statistical area is also in the state of Ohio.
Part of this micropolitan statistical area is also in the state of Vermont.
Part of this micropolitan statistical area is also in the state of Virginia.
Part of this micropolitan statistical area is also in the state of Wisconsin.
The legal definition of this micropolitan statistical area excludes a substantial part of its core city. This area is defined strictly as Whitley County, Kentucky; however, more than 20% of the population of Corbin lives in Knox County, Kentucky.

External links
List at US Census Bureau
PDF map of both Micropolitan and Metropolitan Statistical Areas (13.9 MB) (current as of 6 June 2003)

United States micropolitan areas by state